Vyshkov is an urban-type settlement in Zlynkovsky District of Bryansk Oblast, Russia. Population:

References

Notes

Sources

Urban-type settlements in Bryansk Oblast